Exochi is a community in the municipality Topeiros in the Xanthi regional unit of Greece. It consists of the settlements Exochi, Vaniano, Gkizela, Dafni, Kossos, Kypseli, Melissa and Nea Amisos.

Populated places in Xanthi (regional unit)